Barbara McConnell Barrett (born December 26, 1950) is an American businesswoman, attorney and diplomat who served as the United States secretary of the Air Force from 2019 to 2021. She is also an instrument-rated pilot, and cattle and bison rancher.

As the 25th secretary of the Air Force, Barrett leads the affairs of the Department of the Air Force, comprising the U.S. Air Force and U.S. Space Force.

Barrett is former chair of the Aerospace Corporation and a member on the boards of California Institute of Technology, Jet Propulsion Laboratory, RAND Corporation, Smithsonian Institution, Horatio Alger Association of Distinguished Americans, and Lasker Foundation.

On May 21, 2019, President Donald Trump announced he would nominate Barrett as Secretary of the Air Force. The U.S. Senate confirmed her nomination by a vote of 85–7 on October 16, 2019. She was sworn in October 18, 2019. On June 23, 2021, Barrett was appointed to the Board of Regents of the Smithsonian Institution by a joint resolution of the House of Resolutions and the Senate, filling the vacancy created by the expiration of David M. Rubenstein's tenure on the board. Barrett's appointment will last for a term of 1912 days, ending on September 17, 2026.

Early life and education
Barrett earned her Bachelor of Science in liberal arts, Master of Public Administration in international business, and Juris Doctor degrees at Arizona State University. Honorary doctorates have been conferred by ASU, Embry-Riddle Aeronautical University, Thunderbird School of Global Management, University of South Carolina, Pepperdine University and Finlandia University.

Business career
Barrett was founding chair of Valley Bank of Arizona, and partner at Evans, Kitchel and Jenckes, a large Phoenix law firm. Before the age of 30, she was an executive of two global Fortune 500 companies.

In her community, Barrett was chair of the Arizona District Export Council, World Affairs Council, and Economic Club of Phoenix.

She also served on the boards of Space Foundation, Sally Ride Science, the Center for International Private Enterprise, the Smithsonian Institution, Caltech, the Jet Propulsion Laboratory, and Hershey Trust Company, Mayo Clinic, the Lasker Foundation, Exponent Corporation, Raytheon, and Piper Aircraft. She was president of the International Women's Forum from 1999 through 2001.

Barrett has been the owner and CEO of the Triple Creek Guest Ranch since 1994.

Political and diplomatic career

Gubernatorial campaign
In 1994, she sought to become the first female Republican candidate for Governor of Arizona. She ran in the Republican primary against incumbent governor Fife Symington, but failed to win her party's nomination.

U.S. ambassador to Finland
In 2008 and 2009, Barrett was U.S. ambassador to Finland under President George W. Bush. Barrett was also a senior advisor to the U.S. Mission to the United Nations. She is a member of the Council on Foreign Relations and a participant with Global Leadership Foundation, Club of Madrid and World Economic Forum. She served as chairman for the State Department's Women's Economic Empowerment Working Group, U.S. Advisory Commission on Public Diplomacy and U.S. Secretary of Commerce's Export Conference.

Secretary of the Air Force
On October 16, 2019, Barrett was confirmed as the 25th secretary of the Air Force by a vote of 85–7. She was sworn in on October 18, 2019. On January 12, 2021, Barrett announced that she would resign as Air Force Secretary a day before January 20 inauguration.

Academic career

Barrett is a fellow teaching leadership at Harvard University's John F. Kennedy School of Government. In 2012 Barrett was interim president of Thunderbird School of Global Management, now a unit of the Arizona State University Knowledge Enterprise. She was CEO of the American Management Association. As a member of the U.S. Afghan Women's Council, she founded Project Artemis, a program to train and mentor Afghan women entrepreneurs at Thunderbird.

In 2000, Arizona State University renamed its Honors College “The Craig and Barbara Barrett Honors College” or Barrett, The Honors College in recognition of a $10 million donation from Barbara and her husband, the then-CEO of Intel, Craig Barrett.

Aviation career
An instrument-rated pilot, Barrett was the first civilian woman to land in an F/A-18 Hornet on an aircraft carrier. In 2014, Barrett was inducted into the Arizona Aviation Hall of Fame and received the Worcester Polytechnic Institute Presidential Medal from President Laurie Leshin. She has trained as an astronaut, and was the backup spaceflight participant for the Soyuz TMA-16 flight to the International Space Station. Barrett was also deputy director of the Federal Aviation Administration and vice chairman of the U.S. Civil Aeronautics Board.

Awards and recognition
Barrett has been recognized with the Administrators Award for Distinguished Service by the FAA, Office of the Secretary of Defense Medal for Exceptional Public Service, Horatio Alger Award for Distinguished Americans, Wilson Award for Corporate Citizenship and Sandra Day O'Connor Board Excellence Award. Barrett received the 2018 Heritage Award from the Arizona Chamber of Commerce and Industry.

Personal life
Barrett was born on a farm in Indiana County, Pennsylvania. She is married to Craig Barrett, retired chairman and CEO of Intel. She climbed Tanzania's Mount Kilimanjaro in August 2007 and bicycled 900 kilometers throughout Finland while ambassador.

References

External links

USAF biography

|-

1950 births
Ambassadors of the United States to Finland
American women chief executives
American women lawyers
American lawyers
Arizona lawyers
Arizona Republicans
Arizona State University alumni
George W. Bush administration personnel
Trump administration personnel
Harvard Kennedy School staff
Living people
Ranchers from Montana
Sandra Day O'Connor College of Law alumni
United States Secretaries of the Air Force
American women ambassadors
21st-century American women